Dervish was an unguided air-to-air and air-to-surface rocket developed by the Northrop Corporation for use by the United States Navy and United States Army during the early 1950s. Originally intended as an air-to-air rocket to replace the Mighty Mouse rocket, it was later expanded in role to also operate in an air-to-surface capacity. Spin-stabilized,  in diameter, and powered by a Thiokol TRX-126B solid fuel rocket, in 1958 development of Dervish was resumed as a solely Army project, but no production ever emerged.

References

Citations

Bibliography

Air-to-air rockets of the United States
Air-to-ground rockets of the United States
Cold War rockets of the United States
Abandoned military rocket and missile projects of the United States